This was the first edition of the tournament since 2008, when Cara Black and Liezel Huber won the title.  Black and Huber chose not to participate this year.

Anabel Medina Garrigues and Arantxa Parra Santonja won the title, defeating An-Sophie Mestach and Alison Van Uytvanck in the final, 6–4, 3–6, [10–5].

Seeds

Draw

Draw

References
Main Draw

External links

2015 Singles
Diamond Games
Diamond Games